"Pictures of Matchstick Men" is the first hit single by Status Quo, released on 5 January 1968.

The Status Quo version
The song reached number 7 in the British charts, number 8 in Canada, and number 12 on the Billboard Hot 100, becoming their only Top 40 single in the United States. Francis Rossi confirmed on DVD2 of the Pictures set that it was originally intended to be a B-side to "Gentleman Joe's Sidewalk Cafe", but it was decided to swap the B-side and the A-side of the single.

There are two versions, one in stereo and another in mono, with significant differences: the original single was in mono and has the trademark wah-wah guitar in the breaks between lyrics, but this is omitted in stereo.

The song opens with a single guitar repeatedly playing a simple four-note riff before the bass, rhythm guitar, organ, drums and vocals begin. "Pictures of Matchstick Men" is one of a number of songs from the late 1960s which feature the flanging audio effect. The band's next single release, "Black Veils of Melancholy", was similar but flopped, which caused a change of musical direction.

Rossi (living in a prefab in Camberwell at the time) later said of the song:

The "matchstick men" reference is to the paintings of Salford artist L. S. Lowry.

"Pictures of Matchstick Men" is featured in Men in Black 3, in a scene set in 1969 at Andy Warhol's Factory. It is also featured in the computer game Mafia III, set in 1968, where it can be heard on the radio. The Sky Documentary The United Way, the song featured in the clips of triumphs of the Busby Babes and Manchester United.

Releases
 1968: Pictures of Matchstick Men / Gentleman Joe's Sidewalk Cafe [Promo] 45 rpm Vinyl 7";  Pye / 7N 17449 
 1969: Retrato de hombre con bastón / El café del caballero Joe 33 rpm, Mono Vinyl 7";  Music Hall / MH 31.101   Argentina 
 1973: Pictures of Matchstick Man / Ice in the Sun 45 rpm Vinyl 7";  Pye / 12 746 AT

Other versions

In 1983, the Slickee Boys released the first cover of the song on their album Cybernetic Dreams of Pi'.
In 1989, Camper Van Beethoven scored a number 1 hit on the Billboard Modern Rock Tracks chart in the United States with their version from the album Key Lime Pie. One of the instruments played in this rendering is a violin. It is played at the end of the Ray Donovan episode, "If I Should Fall from Grace with God" (2017; season 5, episode 7).
In 1996, Arjen Anthony Lucassen recorded a cover of this song for his cover album Strange Hobby.
In 1997, a take by the American gothic metal band Type O Negative was recorded, featuring vocals by Ozzy Osbourne, and released on the Private Parts: The Album'' soundtrack.
 In 2007, Kasabian covered the song.
In 2018, Florida-based gothic metal band October Noir released it as a non-album single.

Charts

See also
List of Billboard Modern Rock Tracks number ones of the 1980s

References

External links
  - live acoustic version in 2014

1967 songs
1968 debut singles
1989 singles
Status Quo (band) songs
Pye Records singles
Songs written by Francis Rossi
Song recordings produced by John Schroeder (musician)
British psychedelic rock songs
Psychedelic pop songs
Virgin Records singles
Cadet Records singles